Pointe-à-la-Croix (Cross Point in English) is a municipality located on the Restigouche River in the Gaspésie region of eastern Quebec, Canada. It is situated across from the city of Campbellton, New Brunswick.

In addition to Pointe-à-la-Croix itself, the municipality also includes the communities of L'Alverne, Oak Bay, and Saint-Fidèle-de-Ristigouche.

The municipality is home to the site of the Battle of the Restigouche, a National Historic Site of Canada, and the Petite Rochelle interpretive centre.

History

The history of Cross-Point is based on a cross planted on a small point of land or a small barachois created by a small brook. It is about a half-mile west of Pleasant Loint, indicating a new border between land claimed by Isaac Mann and the newly surveyed Restigouche Indian Reserve. In historical documents, it is sometimes referred to as Crossing Point or Pointe de la traverse and so it is debatable whether the name derived from the fact it was the customary crossing point on this part of the river from the wooden cross indicating a border marking stolen property.

Isaac Mann lived at Pleasant Loint, not Cross Point. The local Mi'kmaq had remained relatively isolated from intrusion except by the European fishermen and a few fur traders and missionaries. The events leading up to the Battle of Restigouche were the beginning of a significant intrusion into the heart of Northern Mi'kmaq territory. The arrival of such a large population of destitute refugees had serious repercussions on the local Amerindian population by the obligation to hunt for survival amid depleting local game. Before the Battle of the Restigouche, they had lived in freedom all around the Bay of Chaleur especially in the Listuguj River. A census taken in 1760 also shows the presence of 500 Gaspesiens Métis. There is historical evidence suggesting discontent and tension between all of the newcomers. The area was named La Petite Rochelle in 1684 when it was granted to Charles Damours, the youngest of the five sons of Mathieu Damours, the owner of the concession de Matane.

La Seigneurie de Petite Rochelle extended from Ruisseau de L`Officier west and also included the concession of Matapedia. Charles was a for trader with a questionable reputation.

Many artefacts from a site in Restigouche-Sud Est have been discovered that may indicate a French establishment of the period (late 1600s). Further professional archaeological research needs to be done in this site. The Seigneurie was one of many that remained undeveloped. During the Battle of Ristigouche an eyewitness description of the events of the third of July 1760 refers to a sort of village or group of Acadian dwellings numbering between 150 and 200, burned by the English. He says that the village was called La Petite Rochelle. It was populated by 1003 Acadian refugees and 500 Métis Gaspesiens. Historically, it was the only French place name ever used in reference to this area.

The village had a short lifespan. It began as a stopping point for watercraft forced to wait before being able to continue upriver. Just below and north of Battery Point, a ship is well protected from the westerly wind. Off Battery Point, the channel is narrow creating a current of up to seven knots. To proceed upriver under sail from there required an east wind and a rising tide. This spot seems to have better suited the desperate Acadian refugee families arriving from southern Acadia. The first large group had arrived in 1757 with Joseph Leblanc dit Le Maigre and had spent the first winter near the Sugarloaf Mountain but transferred across to the place referred to as La Petite Rochelle in spring of 1760.

In a relatively-pristine undeveloped area, Mc Neil's Cove is an important archaeological site.

The first Euro-American settlement in the town was by Acadians fleeing the Expulsion in 1755. Retreating as far as possible up the Restigouche River, they were trapped by a British fleet in the Battle of Restigouche. Approximately 1500 Acadian and Métis took refuge here, with the local Mi'kmaq Native Americans. Their combined resistance was not able to prevent an English landing at their village, which they had named La Petite Rochelle, after the Seingeurie de La Petite Rochelle, situated at Point au Bourdon. The village was completely destroyed by fire on August 23, 1760. Further upriver near Listuguj, the Battle of Restigouche ended with all the French ships and most of the Acadians' boats sunk, but the English were not successful in landing. The Acadians had made their last stand here and survived. Their resistance was in effect a success.

After the conquest, Pointe-à-la-Croix was primarily a fishing, forestry, and farming community until the opening of the J. C. Van Horne Bridge to Campbellton in 1962. In 1969, the town was still incorporated as Cross Point, but changed to the French name in 1970. The town now is nearly fully integrated economically with the Campbellton area. Despite its economical ties and geographical proximity with Campbellton, the municipality observes Eastern Standard Time (UTC -5), which puts it one hour behind Campbellton.

Demographics

Population

Language
Mother tongue:
 English as first language: 10.8%
 French as first language: 86.3%
 English and French as first language: 0.6%
 Other as first language: 2.2%

See also
 Escuminac River
 Restigouche River
 Chaleur Bay
 List of municipalities in Quebec

References 

"A la recherche de La Petite-Rochelle: Memory and Identity in Restigouche", Acadiensis, XXVIII, 2 (Spring 1999), pp. 3–40; article p4

External links 
Municipalities and cities of Gaspe region

Incorporated places in Gaspésie–Îles-de-la-Madeleine
Municipalities in Quebec